Patrice Warrener is a French light artist, mostly known for his Chromolithe Polychromatic Illumination System. Warrener has made more than 60 chromolithe installations over the last fifteen years, lighting up buildings in close to a dozen different nations. Warrener's work has influenced the rising numbers of Light Festivals in many cities of World Heritage status around the world.

Trained as a printer, Patrice made his mark in the world of light shows: first, with the French co-operative Open Light, and then with his collaboration with the English musician, and electronic music pioneer, Tim Blake, with whom he introduced Laser Lighting effects in their Crystal Machine shows in the early 1970s.

In 2016 Warrener illuminated the front of Westminster Abbey in London with coloured light projected onto statues as part of the Lumiere festival.

Chromolithe 
Chromolithe installations have been made for cathedrals and churches, historic public buildings, modern art museums, and even banks.

The chromolithe process starts with data collection, using a specially-built photographic chamber, months of meticulous art work on computer screens, and finally re-projecting the image, printed to 24x24 cm photographic plates, back onto the building from a series of custom-built 6000Kva Xenon projectors, discreetly placed, so as to make the light source appear invisible. 

Some of the cathedrals and intricate sculptured Gothic buildings that have been chromolithed, were originally painted. Thus, Warrener's work can be seen as a restoration of heritage buildings.

Gallery

References

External links
Chromolithe web site
Chromolithe at Lyon on YouTube
Chromolithe in Kobe
Chromolithe at Bradford Festival, 2006

French artists
Year of birth missing (living people)
Living people